Government Polytechnic, Pune is an autonomous institute in Pune, Maharashtra, India.  It gained academic autonomy in May 1994.

Departments
Department of CIVIL Engineering
 Department of electrical engineering
 Department of electronics and telecommunication
 Department of metallurgy
 Department of mechanical engineering
 Department of Computer Engineering
 Department of Information and Technology Engineering
 Department of DRESS DESIGNING AND GARMENT MANUFACTURING

History
This institute was created by Board of Technical Education, Maharashtra State, India. Government of Maharashtra granted initial funding and started 3 years Diploma in Engineering courses. Initial years the Institute did not have its own building and class rooms. They used College of Engineering, Pune premises to conduct classes. Later in the early 1960s they acquired land from Shirole (Patil) family and constructed current building.

The Institute also owns its own boat club next to College of Engineering, Pune. They have fleet of many boats for students to practice and participate in annual race called Regatta. Many past students have enjoyed this rare opportunity to go on boat rides in the junction of two rivers "Mula" and "Mutha".

References

Interview with Prof. Mukund Mahindrakar (Retired)

About the principle http://www.gppune.ac.in/DisplayPage.aspx?page=ga&ItemID=ks

Universities and colleges in Pune